Kenneth Bernard Gibler (January 31, 1931 – November 23, 1990) was an American football and track coach. He served as the head football coach at Missouri Valley College in Marshall, Missouri from 1968 to 1990, compiling a record of 162–64–8.

A native of Grain Valley, Missouri, Gibler attended Missouri Valley College, where he played college football as an end for four seasons before graduating in 1957. He was the head football coach at Blue Springs High School in Blue Springs, Missouri from 1957 to 1961, tallying a mark of 27–18–4. Gibler returned to Missouri Valley as after working as an assistant football coach at Northern Arizona University for six seasons under head coaches Max Spilsbury and Andy MacDonald.

Gibler died of cancer on November 23, 1990, in Marshall.

Head coaching record

College football

Notes

References

External links
 

1931 births
1990 deaths
American football ends
Missouri Valley Vikings football coaches
Missouri Valley Vikings football players
Northern Arizona Lumberjacks football coaches
High school football coaches in Missouri
People from Jackson County, Missouri
Coaches of American football from Missouri
Players of American football from Missouri
Deaths from cancer in Missouri